"Stand by Your Side" is a song recorded by Canadian recording artist Celine Dion, for her eight English studio album, One Heart (2003). It was written by Paul Barry, Mark Taylor, and produced by Taylor and Humberto Gatica. The moving ballad sees Dion promising to someone who has been deeply wounded that she will comfort and support it. It was released on 15 September 2003 as the third (promotional only) single from the album, in the United States. "Stand by Your Side" reached number 17 on the US Hot Adult Contemporary Tracks.

Background and composition
On 16 September 2003, Dion's official website announced that the ballad was selected as the next single for adult contemporary radio in North America.
"Stand by Your Side" was written by Mark Taylor and Paul Barry, who also wrote Cher's smash hit, "Believe" while production was handled by Taylor and Humberto Gatica. It is a pop ballad, where Dion promises someone who has been deeply wounded that she will comfort and support them.

Critical reception
Elisabeth Vincetelli of Entertainment Weekly called it an "inevitable power ballad." Chuck Arnold from People commented, "Even her trademark ballads feature less of the vocal histrionics that we've come to expect from Dion." A review from Billboard wrote that "It is a beauty, elegantly restrained and as singable and well-executed as her many previous hits," but ultimately felt that "close followers of Dion's career can't help but feel disappointed that her label doesn't make a meaningful push to be more adventurous. The double-platinum "One Heart" is ripe with the potential to surprise and delight, whether through the uptempo pop perfection of 'Faith' and 'Reveal' or – if a ballad is considered a must – why not the breathtaking 'I Know What Love Is,' a Celine classic in waiting."

Commercial performance
"Stand by Your Side" debuted at number 29 on the Adult Contemporary chart, on 24 September 2003, with 224 plays and becoming the second most increased AC song that week. On 16 October 2003, the song became the "Greatest Gainer" after climbing to number 18. On 24 October 2003, the song climbed to number 17, its peak position. The song spent 18 weeks inside the Adult contemporary chart.

Credits and personnel

Recording locations
 Recording -  Metrophonic Studios (England)
 Westlake Audio (West Hollywood, California)
 Digital Insight (Winchester, Nevada)
 Capitol Studios (Los Angeles, California)

Personnel
Songwriting – Paul Barry, Mark Taylor
Production – Mark Taylor, Humberto Garcia
Acoustic guitars  – Adam Phillips
Electric guitar - Adam Phillips, Tim Pierce
Percussion  – Luis Jardin
Backing vocals  – Richard Page, Kenya Hathaway, Kimberley Brenner

Credits adapted from the liner notes of One Heart, Epic Records.

Charts

References

External links

Celine Dion songs
2003 singles
Pop ballads
Songs written by Mark Taylor (record producer)
Songs written by Paul Barry (songwriter)
Song recordings produced by Mark Taylor (record producer)
2003 songs
Columbia Records singles
Epic Records singles
2000s ballads